CSH2 may refer to:
 CSH2 (gene), which encodes a hormone of human placental lactogen
 Isle-aux-Grues Airport, an airport in Quebec, Canada